Deadly Harvest is a made for TV movie produced by CBS.  It was shown in September 1972 and in July 1973, and not to be confused with Deadly Harvest (2008), a German / South African remake of the German cult film Fleisch (1979).

Plot

Richard Boone, Patty Duke and Michael Constantine star in this suspense drama of a man whose past as a freedom fighter who has defected from an Iron Curtain country, finally catches up with him.

After living quietly in California's wine country under an assumed name, Anton Solea, played by Boone, is suddenly the target of a would be assassin.  Patty Duke plays a peace activist who tags along with Solea as he is pursued by the unknown enemy.  Constantine plays a neighboring grape grower who lends Solea a helping hand.

Cast
Richard Boone... Anton Solca
Patty Duke ... Jenny
Michael Constantine ... Stefan Groza
Jack Kruschen... Vartanian
Murray Hamilton ... Sheriff Bill Jessup
Jack De Mave ... Franklin
Bill McKeever ...Deputy Charley
Richard Roat ... Peterson
Richard Turner ... Roger
Fred Maio ... Caretaker
Josef Rodriquez ... Attendant

Production

Director: Michael O'Herlihy

Writers: Geoffrey Household (1960 novel - Watcher in the Shadows), Daniel B. Ullman

Release Date: 26 September 1972 (USA)

Filmed in the Napa Valley in California.

References

https://web.archive.org/web/20130421073936/http://news.google.com/newspapers?nid=RW1BPcyHXiwC&dat=19730707&printsec=frontpage

Behind-the-scenes production photos Collection of crew member Stephen Lodge.

1972 television films
American television films
CBS network films
Films based on British novels
Films directed by Michael O'Herlihy